This is list of Mount Everest records of Indian nationals have achieved.

Records

 Chhanda Gayen became the first Indian to climb to the summit of any two Eight-thousanders - Mount Everest and Mount Lhotse in one go on 18 May 2013. She completed the traverse the summit of Mount Everest to the summit of Mount Lhotse in 22 hours.
Satish Gogineni is the fastest Indian to summit two 8000ers. He summited Mount Everest and Mount Lhotse within 20 Hours.
 First Gujarati sisters to climb Mount Everest, Aditi Vaidya (25 yrs.) and Anuja Vaidya (21 yrs.) Reached the top on 22 May 2019. They are from Surat.
 Love Raj Singh Dharmshaktu - climbed Mount Everest seven times.
 In 1984, Bachendri Pal became the first Indian woman to reach the summit of Mount Everest
 Premlata Agarwal  - the first Indian woman mountaineer to complete the Seven Summits and one of the oldest Indian women mountaineers to summit Mount Everest, at age 48, in 2011
Ajeet Bajaj and Deeya Bajaj became the first father-daughter team to climb Mount Everest from India, on May 16, 2018. They are the first father-daughter team in the world to climb the North Side of Mount Everest.
 Gurgaon's 53-year-old Sangeeta Sindhi Bahl, a Miss India finalist in 1985, became the oldest Indian woman to scale the world's highest peak on May 19, 2018.
 Santosh Yadav was the first woman to summit twice in 1992 and 1993
 Tashi and Nungshi Malik became the first female twins to scale Mount Everest on 19 May 2013.

Year wise records

2019
 Aditi Vaidya and Anuja Vaidya become the first Gujarati sisters [women] from Gujarat state to summit Mount Everest on 22 May 2019 in first attempt.
 Amgoth Tukaram [20 years] from Thakkellapally Tanda, Rangareddy District, Telangana. Summit date May 22, 2019 
Megha Parmar an Indian mountaineer born in Bhoj Nagar village, Sehore district summited Mount Everest on May 22, 2019, becoming the first woman from Madhya Pradesh to do so.

2018
Ajeet Bajaj and Deeya Bajaj became the first father-daughter team to climb Mount Everest from India. They are the first father-daughter team to climb the North Side of Mount Everest.
 Shivangi Pathak born and currently living in Hisar District in Haryana, also summited on 16 May 2018. She is the youngest Indian Women to Climb from the South Side.

2017
 Anshu Jamsenpa, from Bomdilla in Arunachal Pradesh, became the first woman to make a dual ascent of Mount Everest within a span of five days, setting the record for fastest double ascent in a single climbing season by a woman. This is a new world record set by the woman who broke the previous record of Nepal's Chhurim Sherpa, who had ascended Mount Everest twice in a week in 2012. Jamsenpa reached the summit of the world's highest mountain for the second time on 21 May 2017.
 Indian Navy undertook a momentary expedition to Mount Everest in 2017 specially termed "Sagartal se Sagarmatha" meaning "Seabed to Summit" where in the ceremonial ice-axe was taken underwater to the lowest sea-bed in Karwar and was successfully taken atop the World's Highest Point. The Expedition was also inline with honouring the India's first successful expedition to Mount Everest led by legend of Indian Mountaineering Capt MS Kohli (IN)in May 1965. the expedition team consisted of 18 climbers and 06 support team. 04 climbers from Team A which includes Lt Anant Kukreti, Lt Cdr C S Yadav, Lt Shashank Tewari and Bikas Maharana (COM I) had successfully summited the peak at 0630hrs on 21 May 2017. Members of team B stood test of time and sustained prolonged stay at 6400m high camp II. They displayed true grit and determination by not giving up in adverse weather conditions but awaited patiently to scale the highest peak in the world on the first available opportunity and had successfully summited Mount Everest, 8848 m at 0730 hrs on 27 May 17. The team consisted of Lt Cdr Hari Prasath, Hariom (PO), Sandeep Singh (LPT), Ashish Gupta (LA AH) and Avinash Bhawane (MA I).  Apart from the main expedition team, 02 members of the support team Sachin Kanjalkar (LMA) and Manoj Adari (LMA) successfully summited Mount Lhotse at 1000 hrs on 25 May 2017. Mount Lhotse is the sister peak of Mount Everest. Standing at 8516M, it is the fourth highest peak in the world after Everest, K2 and Kanchenjunga.
 Oil major ONGC's 3 employees Yogendar Garbiyal, from Garbyang Village in Pithoragarh, Uttarakhand, Rahul Jarngal from Hiranagar, J&K and Ngayaising Jagoi  scaled Mount Everest on 27 May 2017 as a part of ONGC Mission Everest 2017. Their team was led by famous Indian mountaineer Shri Love Raj Singh Dharmshaktu who reached the summit at 06:10 am along with Yogendar. Rahul and Jagoi reached the summit at 07:00am. Three more ONGC employees Nirmal Kumar from Doda, J&K, Santosh Kumar SIngh from Pithoragarh, UK and Prabhat Gaurav from Bihar summited a day later on 28 May 2017
.

2016
 An all-girls 10-member expedition put some people on the summit. This team came across the stricken Bengal climbers and tried to help them.

International records by Indians

See also 
 Indian summiters of Mount Everest - Year wise
 List of Mount Everest records
 Everest (Indian TV series)

References 

Records,India
Climbing and mountaineering-related lists
Mountaineering in India
Indian mountain climbers
Everest